Patricia Mora may refer to:

 Pat Mora (born 1942), American poet and writer
 Patricia Mora Castellanos (born 1951), Costa Rican academic and politician